"Muskrat Love" is a soft rock song written by Willis Alan Ramsey. The song depicts a romantic liaison between two anthropomorphic muskrats named Susie and Sam. It was  first recorded in 1972 by Ramsey for his sole album release Willis Alan Ramsey. The song was originally titled "Muskrat Candlelight" referencing the song's opening lyric.

A 1973 cover version by the folk/rock band America—retitled "Muskrat Love" for the lyrics that close the chorus—was a minor hit reaching number 67 on the Billboard Hot 100 chart. In 1976, a cover by pop music duo Captain & Tennille resulted in the song's highest profile, peaking at number four on the Hot 100 chart.  It also reached number two on the Cash Box chart, which ranked it as the 30th biggest hit of 1976.

America version

Background
America recorded "Muskrat Love" for their 1973 album Hat Trick, marking the second time the band had recorded a song not written by a member of America. In putting together 10 songs to comprise the eventual Hat Trick album, America's members Gerry Beckley, Dewey Bunnell, and Dan Peek had agreed to each contribute three compositions with a mutually agreeable cover song being recorded as the 10th track. David Dickey, who played bass for America, brought Ramsey's "Muskrat Candlelight" to the group's attention; according to Beckley, "to us it sounded like a very bluesy, quirky tune. We just felt it was quirky and commercial, and we worked it up."

Release and reception
"Muskrat Love" was issued as an advance single from Hat Trick in July 1973, although Dan Peek would recall that America's label Warner Bros. "hated" the track and "begged us not to release it as a single...We were stupid to press the issue, but we liked the song for its easy, acoustic, harmonic beauty, not realizing that perhaps it was badly cast for us in order to retain the fairly hip image we had eked out". Peek adds that the single "easily hit the Top 40 on the strength of our past successes" although "Muskrat Love" in fact marked a downturn in America's popularity with a low peak on the Billboard Hot 100 at number 67; the single did better on Cashbox, reaching 33, and the Billboard adult contemporary, chart reaching number 11.

In a 2012 interview, Gerry Beckley said of "Muskrat Love": "It's a polarizing little number. After concerts, some people tell us they can't believe we didn't play it, while others go out of their way to thank us for not performing it."

Track listings
 "Muskrat Love" – 3:06
 "Cornwall Blank" – 4:19

Chart performance

Captain & Tennille version

Background
Captain & Tennille recorded "Muskrat Love" for their 1976 album release Song of Joy. According to Toni Tennille, who formed Captain & Tennille with her husband Daryl Dragon, the duo had added the song to their nightclub set list a few years earlier after hearing the America single on their car radio: "I said to Daryl: 'Did you hear that? I swear they're singing about muskrats.' I had to know what the lyrics were so the next day we went out and found the sheet music. I said to Daryl: 'This song is hysterical; why don’t we add it to our club-act?' And [the audience] went nuts for it." Being short one track for Song of Joy, Captain & Tennille made an impromptu decision to record "Muskrat Love", including the synthesizer generated sound effects that Dragon had created for the song's performance in their nightclub act, these sound effects meant to evoke the imagined sound of muskrats mating: the eventual 7-inch single version of Captain & Tennille's "Muskrat Love" would feature an "endless loop" of these sound effects created by having the song's end run into the locked groove of the 45.

Despite Captain & Tennille's stated disinterest in highlighting "Muskrat Love" as an item in their repertoire, it was the song they chose to sing at a July 1976 White House dinner honoring Queen Elizabeth II: the press subsequently ran a statement from a dinner guest who opined it was "in very poor taste" to sing of mating muskrats before the Queen. Toni Tennille responded to this charge saying: "only a person with a dirty mind would see something wrong. It's a gentle Disneyesque kind of song."

Release and reception
Purportedly there were no plans to issue a third single off Song of Joy following the Top Ten success of "Lonely Night (Angel Face)" and "Shop Around"; however, A&M Records decided to issue "Muskrat Love" as a single after WISM, a Madison, Wisconsin radio station that had been airing the album cut, reported phenomenal listener response to the song in September 1976. Captain & Tennille's "Muskrat Love" reached a number 4 Hot 100 peak that December, and number 2 on Cash Box.  It became their biggest Easy Listening chart hit, spending four non-consecutive weeks at number 1.  It also reached number one on the Canadian pop singles chart.  It did not chart outside North America except in Australia, where it became a minor hit (#65).

Based on the Captain & Tennille version, "Muskrat Love" has become a staple on "worst song" lists, including a 2006 poll by CNN.com. Gerry Beckley of America cited "Muskrat Love" as "a fine example of where the closer you go back to the original seed, the nicer it is. Ours was once removed, and the Captain & Tennille's was even more removed." In a 2001 interview with Reno News & Review, Toni Tennille said of Captain & Tennille's "Muskrat Love": "I don’t know why people are so polarized about this tune. People either love it or they loathe it."

The song was also featured in "The Annotated History of American Muskrat," a 2014 production of the Circuit Theatre Company in Boston, Massachusetts. It appears in the 2013 film Anchorman 2: The Legend Continues.

Track listings
 "Muskrat Love" 3:28
 "Honey Come Love Me" - 2:57

Chart performance

Weekly charts

Year-end charts

Other versions
The first cover version of "Muskrat Candlelight" was an abridged version entitled "Sun Down" recorded by Lani Hall for her 1972 album Sun Down Lady. With composition credit to Willis Alan Ramsey and "additional lyrics" credited to Lani Hall and her husband Herb Alpert, "Sun Down" reformats Ramsey's original tune as a straightforward love song, omitting the anthropomorphic rodent fantasy. It was on A&M Records, which Herb Alpert founded and ran, that "Muskrat Love" with its original lyrics would become a major hit for Captain & Tennille in 1976.

Parodies
A parody version of "Muskrat Love" entitled "Hamster Love" was written and performed by Big Daddy and included on Dr. Demento's 30th Anniversary album. 
Another parody called "Muskrat Gloves" was recorded by comedian Tim Cavanagh.
The song was performed in the Space Ghost Coast to Coast episode "Sequel" (which featured Captain & Tennille as guests) with added vocals from Space Ghost and Birdman. In the episode, Birdman claimed the song to be him and his wife (Gravity Girl)'s song.
Three different versions of the song are sung in The Proud Family: Louder and Prouder episode "The Soul Vibrations", where the titular band performs it in three different flashbacks: a funk version, a slow ballad version, and a barbershop quartet version. The ballad version is featured on the soundtrack album for the series.

See also
List of number-one adult contemporary singles of 1976 (U.S.)

References

External links
 Lyrics of this song
 

1972 songs
1973 singles
1976 singles
America (band) songs
Captain & Tennille songs
RPM Top Singles number-one singles
Warner Records singles
A&M Records singles
Songs about mammals
Songs written by Willis Alan Ramsey